Urs Meier (born 7 July 1961) is a Swiss football manager. He is the previous manager of FC Zürich in the Swiss Super League.

Coaching career
After working with the youth teams at both Bellinzona and Grasshoppers, Meier worked as a playing assistant manager for Grasshoppers. He then moved to FC Altstetten in 1995 as a playing manager. He decided to retire in 1997 but continued as the manager for the club until 1998. He then moved to FC Thun and worked with the youth sector until 1999. In the 1999/00 season, he was the manager of FC Baden, from 2000 to 2003 for FC Solothurn and from 2003 to 2004 at FC Baden again.

He previously coached FC Baden, FC Solothurn and the Liechtenstein national football team.

Since the 2017/18 season he has been the head coach of FC Rapperswil-Jona in the Challenge League.

References

External links
Urs Meier at Footballdatabase

1961 births
Living people
Footballers from Zürich
Association football defenders
Swiss men's footballers
FC Schaffhausen players
AC Bellinzona players
Grasshopper Club Zürich players
Swiss football managers
FC Zürich managers
Liechtenstein national football team managers
FC Baden managers
Swiss expatriate football managers
Expatriate football managers in Liechtenstein
FC Zürich non-playing staff